Constant Albrecht (Albert) Desenfans (Genappe, 24 January 1845 – Braine-l'Alleud, 12 March 1938) was a Belgian sculptor.

Desenfans studied at the Académie Royale des Beaux-Arts in Brussels as a pupil of Eugène Simonis.  Most of the work in his career is related to the building and public park projects of King Leopold II of Belgium in the years between 1870 and 1907. In his hometown of Schaerbeek is a street named after him.

His works include:

 Bronze figures of Hainaut and Limbourg at the Triumphal Arch at the Cinquantenaire
 Figures of Day and Night in the Passage du Nord, Brussels
 work at the Botanical Garden of Brussels
 Eve and the Serpent (1913) and other work at Josaphat Park, Schaerbeek
Figure of Justice at the Palace of Justice, Brussels in Brussels

References

External links

1845 births
1938 deaths
19th-century Belgian sculptors
19th-century Belgian male artists
20th-century Belgian sculptors
People from Genappe
20th-century Belgian male artists